Blanquita is a 2022 internationally co-produced drama film directed by Fernando Guzzoni, starring Alejandro Goic, Amparo Noguera, Marcelo Alonso, Daniela Ramírez and Ariel Grandón. The film had its premiere on September 4, 2022 at the 79th Venice International Film Festival in the Horizon section, where it won an award for best screenplay.

It was released on December 9 at Cinema Village in New York City, and at Laemmle Glendale in Los Angeles. The film was selected as the Chilean entry for the Best International Feature Film at the 95th Academy Awards.

Cast
 Laura López as Blanquita
 Alejandro Goic
 Amparo Noguera
 Marcelo Alonso 
 Daniela Ramírez
 Ariel Grandón

Release
The film had its world premiere at the 79th Venice International Film Festival on 5 September 2022. It also made it to 'World Cinema' section of 27th Busan International Film Festival where it was screened on 9 October, and 'International Perspective' section of 46th São Paulo International Film Festival, where it was screened on 22 October 2022. Later in December, it was invited to the 28th Kolkata International Film Festival, where it was screened on 17 December 2022, and to the 34th Palm Springs International Film Festival to be screened on January 7, 2023.

The film was released theatrically in New York and Los Angeles on December 9, 2022 by Outsider Pictures.

Reception
On the review aggregator Rotten Tomatoes website, the film has an approval rating of 100% based on 20 reviews, with an average rating of 7.7/10. On Metacritic, it has a weighted average score of 77 out of 100 based on 6 reviews, indicating "generally favorable reviews".

Marta Bałaga reviewing for Cineuropa wrote, "Blanquita is devoid of colour and seemingly also emotion, which makes perfect sense". Bałaga praised the director for execution of the film writing, "it’s the fact that his (director) well-executed film is not exactly explicit". She opined that not making film explicit would make more people see it. Wendy Ide reviewing for ScreenDaily praised the film, writing, "An atmospheric thriller which is carried by an assured central performance from López."

Ronda Racha Penrice reviewing for TheWrap praised the acting of Laura López writing, "López perfectly strikes a great balance between Blanca’s toughness and vulnerability". Penrice commended Fernando Guzzoni for "using all his talent to amplify the sad reality of social injustice". She further wrote that Guzzoni "created a compelling thriller that probes deep, posing critical questions about society’s continual failure to protect children." She praised the cinematography of Benjamín Echazarreta writing, "The impressive cinematography by Benjamín Echazarreta has a moodiness that highlights the inherent drama of Blanquita."

Awards and nominations

References

External links
 
 
 
 
 
 Blanquita in Venice International Film Festival

2022 films
2022 drama films
Chilean drama films
Spanish drama films
Mexican drama films
Luxembourgian drama films
French drama films
Polish drama films
2020s Spanish-language films
2020s Chilean films
2020s Mexican films
2020s Spanish films
2020s French films
Films based on actual events